is an upcoming original Japanese anime television series produced by Kadokawa Corporation and directed by Tsutomu Mizushima.

References

External links
Official website 

Anime with original screenplays
Upcoming anime television series